Statistics of the Scottish Football League in season 1915–16. The competition was won by Celtic by eleven points over nearest rival Rangers. Division Two was abandoned due to the outbreak of World War I.

Scottish League

Results

See also
1915–16 in Scottish football

References

 
1915-16